The name Neoguri has been used to name four tropical cyclone in the western north Pacific Ocean. In addition, the variant Noguri was used in 2002 before the spelling was corrected by the WMO Typhoon Committee. The name was contributed by South Korea and is a Korean word for raccoon dog.

 Severe Tropical Storm Noguri (2002) (T0204, 07W, Espada) – approached Japan.
 Typhoon Neoguri (2008) (T0801, 02W, Ambo) – struck China.
 Typhoon Neoguri (2014) (T1408, 08W, Florita)- A Category 5 storm that eventually made landfall in Japan and Korea.
 Typhoon Neoguri (2019) (T1920, 21W, Perla)

Pacific typhoon set index articles